Kudan may refer to:
 Kudan, Rajasthan, in India
 Kudan, Nigeria, a Local Government Area in Kaduna State
 Kudan, 9th degree black belt, see Dan (rank)
 The Kudan (九段), a residence in Tokyo, Japan, since 1944 the official residence of the Philippine Ambassador to Japan
 Kudan (yōkai), a Japanese spirit